Micrasepalum is a genus of flowering plants belonging to the family Rubiaceae.

Its native range is Caribbean.

Species:

Micrasepalum eritrichoides 
Micrasepalum haitiense

References

Rubiaceae
Rubiaceae genera